A wilderness study area (WSA) contains undeveloped United States federal land retaining its primeval character and influence, without permanent improvements or human habitation, and managed to preserve its natural conditions.  In spite of this, WSAs are not included in the National Wilderness Preservation System.

On Bureau of Land Management lands, a WSA is a roadless area that has been inventoried (but not designated by Congress) and found to have wilderness characteristics as described in Section 603 of the Federal Land Policy and Management Act of 1976 and Section 2(c) of the Wilderness Act of 1964. Wilderness Study Area  characteristics:

 Size – roadless areas of at least  of public lands or of a manageable size;
 Naturalness – generally appears to have been affected primarily by the forces of nature rather than human activity;
 Opportunities – provides outstanding opportunities for solitude or primitive and unconfined types of recreation.

BLM manages wilderness study areas under the National Landscape Conservation System to protect their value as wilderness until Congress decides whether to designate them as wilderness.  Wilderness bills often include so-called "release language" that eliminates WSAs not selected for wilderness designation.

Some WSAs are managed in exactly the same manner as "wilderness areas", a specific government designation and not synonymous with the natural state of "wilderness.  Some areas permit activities that are generally excluded from wildernesses, such as mountain biking and off-roading.

See also
 Landscape
 List of wilderness study areas
 National Wilderness Preservation System
 Natural landscape
 Protected areas of the United States
 United States National Forest
 Wilderness

Notes

External links
 Federal Land Policy and Management Act of 1976
 Wilderness Area information page, Bureau of Land Management website.

Protected areas of the United States